Robert Stuart Skirving is the eighth and current bishop of the Episcopal Diocese of East Carolina. He was elected on May 17, 2014 and consecrated on November 8, 2014. As a part of his ministry in the wider Episcopal Church, Bishop Skirving also serves as the Chancellor of Sewanee: The University of the South.

Biography
Skirving was born on August 28, 1960, in Windsor, Ontario, Canada. He studied at the University of Waterloo in Ontario and graduated with a Bachelor of Arts in philosophy in 1982. He then earned a Master of Divinity from Huron University College in London, Ontario in 1986.

He was ordained deacon on May 1, 1986, in St Paul's Cathedral, London, Ontario, and then a priest on December 17, 1986, in St James' Westminster Church in London, Ontario by Derwyn Dixon Jones, the Bishop of Huron. He then became assistant curate at the Church of St John the Evangelist in London, Ontario. Between 1988 and 1991, he became rector of Advent Church, Redeemer Church, and Trinity Church in Ridgetown. In 1992, he became rector of St Mark's Church in Brantford, Ontario. In 1998, he graduated with a Doctor of Ministry from Seabury-Western Theological Seminary. From 1999 till 2004, he served as rector of Bishop Cronyn Memorial Church in London, Ontario, while in 2005, he became rector of St John's Church in Midland, Michigan, after being received into the Episcopal Church by the Bishop of Eastern Michigan Edwin M. Leidel Jr.

See also
 List of Episcopal bishops of the United States
 Historical list of the Episcopal bishops of the United States

References 

Living people
Episcopal Church in North Carolina
People from Windsor, Ontario
Religious leaders from North Carolina
University of Waterloo alumni
Sewanee: The University of the South administrators
1960 births
Episcopal bishops of East Carolina